The Heleomyzidae is a small family of true flies in the insect order Diptera. Over 740 described species of Heleomyzidae occur in about 76 genera distributed throughout the world.

Description
Heleomyzids are small to medium-sized flies which vary in colour from yellow to reddish yellow or reddish brown to black. The wings often have small but distinctly longer, well-spaced spines mixed with the shorter spines along the leading edge and the crossveins are often clouded.

Taxonomy

Over 740 described species of Heleomyzidae occur in about 76 genera and 22 tribes distributed throughout the world; the greatest number occur in the Holarctic region. Around 100 species of Heleomyzidae are found in North America. Most of the subfamilies have been commonly recognized as families in the past, but are now included within the Heleomyzidae. The composition and monophyly of the family continues to be controversial. McAlpine recently combined Heleomyzidae and Sphaeroceridae into Heteromyzidae, but this arrangement has not been widely accepted.

Ecology
Adults of Borboroides and Heleomicra are attracted to carcasses and faeces. Larvae feed on decaying plant and animal matter, mushrooms, and various fungi. The larvae of the Holarctic Suilliinae and Tapeigaster occur principally in fungi. Larvae of Cairnsimyia live in borer tunnels in trees.

References

External links

 Family description and figures

Identification resources

Palaearctic
 Czerny, L.,  1924. Monographie der Helomyziden. Abhandlung der Zoologischen-Botanischen Gesellschaft in Wien, 15(1): 1–166. Keys genera and species.
 Czerny, L., 1937. Ergänzungen zu meiner Monographie der Helomyziden. X. Konowia, 16(2): 137–142.
 Gorodkov, K.B.,  1984. Family Heleomyzidae (Helomyzidae), 15–45.In: Soós Á. and L. Papp, (eds.), Catalogue of Palaearctic Diptera, vol.10, Budapest.
 Papp, T.,1978. Some cavernicolous Diptera of the Geneva Museum. Revue Suisse de Zoologie 85: 99-106.
 Papp, T., 1998. Heleomyzidae. Chapter 3.41, 439–455. In: Papp L. and B. Darvas, (eds.), Contribution to a manual of Palaearctic Diptera. Vol. 3. 1998. Science Herald, Budapest, 880 pp.

United Kingdom
 Collin, J.E. 1943b. The British species of Helomyzidae (Diptera). Entomologist's Monthly Magazine 79: 234–251.

Nearctic
 Gill, G.D.,  1962. The Heleomyzid flies of America north of Mexico(Diptera: Heleomyzidae). Proceedings of the U.S. National Museum, 113(3465): 495–603. Keys genera and species.
 Gill, G.D and B.V. Peterson, 1987.1989. Heleomyzidae, 973–980. In:McAlpine J. F., (ed.), Manual of Nearctic Diptera Vol. 2, Research Branch Agric. Canada, Monograph no. 28, IV + 675–1332. Keys genera and species.

Australasia
 McAlpine, D.K.,  1985. The Australian genera of Heleomyzidae (Diptera: Schizophora) and a reclassification of the family into tribes. Records of the Australian Museum, 36: 203–251.

Taxonomic lists
 World list
 The European subfamilies, tribes, genera and species - Fauna Europaea
 West Palaearctic including Russia                       
 Nearctic
 Australasian/Oceania    	  
 Japan

 
Brachycera families
Articles containing video clips